Buchan  is an area of north-east Scotland, historically one of the original provinces of the Kingdom of Alba. It is now one of the six committee areas and administrative areas of Aberdeenshire Council, Scotland. These areas were created by the council in 1996, when the Aberdeenshire council area was created under the Local Government etc (Scotland) Act 1994. The council area was formed by merging three districts of the Grampian Region: Banff and Buchan, Gordon and Kincardine and Deeside. The committee area of Buchan was formed from part of the former district of Banff and Buchan.

Etymology 
The genesis of the name Buchan is shrouded in uncertainty, but may be of Pictish origin. The name may involve an equivalent of Welsh buwch meaning "a cow". American academic Thomas Clancy has noted cautiously the similarity between the territory names Buchan and Marr to those of the Welsh commotes Cantref Bychan and Cantref Mawr, meaning "small-" and "large-commote", respectively.

History
The first documentary record of Buchan is a reference in the Chronicle of the Kings of Alba to the death of King Indulf at the hands of Vikings in Buchan in 962, a death separately recorded in a 12th-century king-list as taking place at Cullen. Cullen is to the west of the River Deveron, in an area where the Earls of Buchan held land as late as the 13th century, suggesting that Buchan's boundaries at this time extended as far west as the River Spey.

Buchan is also the name of a much larger historic province and earldom, shown on maps as early as 1708, which included the whole of the modern committee area called Buchan.

In Pictish times, Buchan was located within the kingdom of Ce. There is considerable ancient history in this geographic area, especially slightly northwest of Cruden Bay, where the Catto Long Barrow and numerous tumuli are found.

The Earldom of Mar and Buchan formed one of the seven original Scottish earldoms; later the Earl of Buchan became separated from Mar.

At one time, the district of Buchan comprised all the land between the rivers River Don and Deveron, but now the land between the River Don and the Ythan is known as Formartine, so Buchan now only refers to that land between the Ythan and Deveron.

Features 
The Buchan area has a population of 39,160 (2001 census) and an area of 547 km2. It contains the town of Peterhead and is adjacent to the committee and administrative areas of Banff and Buchan and Formartine.

Peterhead is the largest town in Buchan and Aberdeenshire; the principal white fish landing port in Europe; and a major oil industry service centre. Equally important is the nearby gas terminal at St Fergus. Remote Radar Head Buchan, a RAF air defence radar unit, is located near Peterhead.

Attempts are being made to counter the negative effects of several recent key company closures and economic threats. Inland, the area is dependent upon agriculture, and many villages have seen a decline in population and services. Issues affecting Banff and Buchan also apply here, as does the future of the oil and gas industry. Part of Buchan benefits from EU aid coverage. Opportunities exist through the Buchan Local Action Plan to safeguard and enhance the economic future of Peterhead and Buchan.

The Formartine and Buchan Way runs through Buchan.

References

Bibliography

External links
1714 map showing Buchan
1745 Map showing the sheriffdom of Aberdeen (Buchan and Mar)
1745 Map showing the sheriffdom of Aberdeen (Buchan and Mar)

 
Provinces of Scotland